Lemoore Union High School (commonly known as Lemoore High School or Lemoore High) is a public school located in Lemoore, California. It serves grades 9 through 12 and is accredited through the California Department of Education. Its enrollment for 2006-2007 was 2066 students.

History
Lemoore High School was originally opened in 1900 to 35 students assembled as freshmen in the old Heinlen Hall in downtown Lemoore and began classes. Students in that first year were offered Latin, ancient History, Algebra, and English. In 1902, the high school moved after Lemoore voters approved a school bond to build a new facility on the corner of Fox and B Streets. Lemoore High Schools first graduating class (1904) consisted of three people: Margaret Hayes, Arthur Blank, and Ed Blank. In 1909, the first football team was formed from the 18 boys enrolled. The first school bus, a 20-passenger, 15 mile per hour average speed vehicle, made its debut in 1916. The current school, located at 101 East Bush Street was opened February 1, 1924. Ellen Truckell was the 1929 Student Body President, the first female president to serve at Lemoore High School.

In 1940, the "music building" (the small building west of the main gym) was added to provide a band and choir room, ceramics studio, and 2 classrooms; and the auto shop was added to the existing shop building (that is now the maintenance department). In 1941, a swimming pool was added; in 1953, the Ag building; in 1958, the J.F. Graham Memorial Gymnasium; in 1960, the business building, followed by the science wing and administration building in 1962. The home economics building was completed in 1963, and followed in turn by the library and tennis courts in 1964. The football stadium and bus garage were finished in 1965. The metal shop (now the auto shop, T-1) was erected in 1969, along with the industrial drawing and electronics classrooms. In 1970, the "girls" gym was remodeled, and the exercise room added.

In 1973, a $2.75 million bond was supported by the taxpayers to erect the 10 classrooms in the S-Wing, the cafeteria, wood shop, and an addition to the boys' locker room. In 1978, the main building was renovated. In 1991 a new swimming pool was completed, and the old pool buildings converted to classrooms.

In 1993, the Gundacker Center was established to house the alternative education programs, such as Continuation, Adult Ed, Independent Study, Pregnant Minors (Cyesis), and Child Care programs. The Gundacker Center was dedicated to Gertrude Gundacker, a longtime faculty member. The Continuation School is dedicated to Don Jamison, the first continuation principal and a track coach.

Notable alumni

Notable Lemoore High School alumni include:
Tommie Smith - Olympic Gold Medalist and Civil rights activist
Steve Perry - Musician
Michael A. Baker - Astronaut
David Ausberry - NFL football player
Charlie Jones - NFL football player
Larry Jones - NFL football player
Dale Messer - NFL football player
Lorenzo Neal - NFL football player
Kelly Rondestvedt - Investment banker and Hereditary Princess of Saxe-Coburg and Gotha 
Alex Perez - Professional MMA fighter competing in the Ultimate Fighting Championship (UFC). Currently ranked #4 in the Flyweight Division.
Isaiah Martinez - American freestyle wrestler and graduated folkstyle wrestler
Chris Pendleton - 2X NCAA Wrestling Champion and Head Wrestling Coach at Oregon State

References

External links
 Lemoore Union High School District

Public high schools in California
Lemoore, California
Schools in Kings County, California
W. H. Weeks buildings
1901 establishments in California